William Drayton may refer to:

William Drayton Sr. (1732–1790), American judge from Charleston, South Carolina
William Drayton (1776–1846), U.S. Congressman from Charleston, South Carolina
Bill Drayton (born 1943), American social entrepreneur and environmentalist
Flavor Flav (born 1959), real name William Drayton, American rapper with Public Enemy
William Henry Drayton (1742–1779), American lawyer, South Carolina delegate to Continental Congress
Billy Drayton, character in The Mist

See also
 William L. Dayton (1807–1864), American politician
 William Lewis Dayton Jr. (1829–1897), American lawyer, judge and diplomat